Sannoju Mukai (1898 - 1963) was a Japanese biochemist,  
emeritus professor at faculty of technology, Kumamoto University, and a professor of Keijo University.  
He is also father of Jun-Ichiro Mukai.

Academic works 
Mukai made a contribution in Enzyme Chemistry by "On the activation of castor lipase by acids and the ps curve of its action."
According to Chemisches Zentralblatt (1929 Band I, Nr.8, 20 Februar), 
"The optimum effect of the castor lipase is not only dependent on the pH in the Rk. dependent on Mg. Vf. tried the Mg-Verbb. can be removed by treating with H2S04 (75 ccm 0.0.5-n. H2S04, 10g castor oil powder, 30 min.), washing out and drying for four days.
The optimal working conditions were then found at pH = 5.62.
-— In the case of unsuccessful attempts, dio Mg-Verb. with pepsin or trypsin, activation of lipase by pepsin has been observed. (Journ. Soc. chem. Ind., Japan [Suppl.] 31. 185 B.
1928. Kyushu, Imp. Univ.) "

Life 
Mukai is originally from Saga prefecture.  
After graduateing Kyushu University, 
he became an assistant professor of Kyushu University.  
He was a professor of Keijo University until the end of World War II. 
After the war, 
he became a professor of Kumamoto University.

Notes 

1898 births
Japanese biochemists
Kyushu University alumni
People from Saga Prefecture
1963 deaths